The men's rings competition was one of eight events for male competitors in artistic gymnastics at the 1980 Summer Olympics in Moscow. The qualification and final rounds took place on July 20, 22 and 25th at the Luzhniki Palace of Sports. There were 65 competitors from 14 nations, with nations competing in the team event having 6 gymnasts while other nations could have to up to 3 gymnasts. The event was won by Alexander Dityatin of the Soviet Union, the nation's fifth victory in the rings, with fellow Soviet Aleksandr Tkachyov taking silver. It was the second consecutive Games that the Soviet Union had the top two men in the rings. Dityatin, the silver medalist in Montreal 1976, was the seventh man to win multiple medals in the rings. Jiří Tabák earned Czechoslovakia's first medal in the event since 1948.

Background

This was the 15th appearance of the event, which is one of the five apparatus events held every time there were apparatus events at the Summer Olympics (no apparatus events were held in 1900, 1908, 1912, or 1920). The top four of the six finalists from 1976 returned: gold medalist Nikolai Andrianov and silver medalist Alexander Dityatin of the Soviet Union, bronze medalist Dan Grecu of Romania, and fourth-place finisher Ferenc Donath of Hungary. There had been two world championships since the 1976 Games; in 1978, Andrianov won, followed by Dityatin and Grecu, while in 1979, Dityatin was the victor with Grecu second and Aleksandr Tkachyov of the Soviet Union third.

Brazil made its debut in the men's rings. Hungary made its 13th appearance, tying the United States (absent from the rings event for the first time since the inaugural 1896 Games) for most of any nation.

Competition format

Each nation entered a team of six gymnasts or up to three individual gymnasts. All entrants in the gymnastics competitions performed both a compulsory exercise and a voluntary exercise for each apparatus. The scores for all 12 exercises were summed to give an individual all-around score. These exercise scores were also used for qualification for the apparatus finals. The two exercises (compulsory and voluntary) for each apparatus were summed to give an apparatus score. The top 6 in each apparatus participated in the finals, except that nations were limited to two finalists each; others were ranked 7th through 65th. Half of the preliminary score carried over to the final.

Schedule

All times are Moscow Time (UTC+3)

Results

Sixty-five gymnasts competed in the compulsory and optional rounds on July 20 and 22. The six highest scoring gymnasts advanced to the final on July 25. Each country was limited to two competitors in the final. Half of the points earned by each gymnast during both the compulsory and optional rounds carried over to the final. This constitutes the "prelim" score.

Grecu suffered a muscle tear during the competition, which led to his transition from competitor to coach after the Games.

References

Official Olympic Report
www.gymnasticsresults.com
www.gymn-forum.net

Men's rings
Men's 1980
Men's events at the 1980 Summer Olympics